Two ships in the United States Navy have been named USS Glide:

 , was a gunboat, launched in 1862 and burned in 1863
 , was a sternwheeler, launched in 1863 and decommissioned in 1865

United States Navy ship names